Leif Daniel Tjernström (born 19 February 1974) is a Swedish former professional footballer who played as a midfielder. He is best remembered for his time with AIK which he represented between 1999 and 2013 and played 395 games for. A full international between 1997 and 1999, he won five caps for the Sweden national team.

Club career

Early career 
Tjernström started his footballing career at Bråtens IK before spending three seasons in Division 2 Västra with KB Karlskoga. In 1993 he signed for Degerfors IF with which he won the 1992–93 Svenska Cupen and spent three Allsvenskan seasons with. In 1996, he was signed by Örebro SK and represented them for three seasons.

AIK 
He signed with AIK in 1999, and played in the group stage of the 1999–2000 UEFA Champions League against FC Barcelona, Arsenal FC, and Fiorentina. He helped the team win the 1998–1999 Svenska Cupen, and served as the team captain when AIK won the 2009 Allsvenskan and 2009 Svenska Cupen. He scored the game-winning goal against IFK Göteborg in November 2009 when AIK secured their first Allsvenskan title in nine years. He made his last appearance for AIK during the 2013 Allsvenskan season in a 2–1 win against Elfsborg, which was his 395th competitive game for the club.

International career 
Tjernström represented the Sweden U21 team six times before making his full international debut for the Sweden national team on 9 February 1997 in a friendly game against Romania when he replaced Marino Rahmberg in the 76h minute in a 2–0 win. He made his fifth and final appearance for Sweden on 27 November 1999 in a friendly game against South Africa, playing for 59 minutes before being replaced by Tobias Linderoth in a 1–0 loss. He also represented the Sweden B team once in 1997.

Career statistics

Club

International

Honours 
Degerfors
 Svenska Cupen: 1992–93
AIK
 Allsvenskan: 2009
 Svenska Cupen: 1998–99, 2009
 Supercupen: 2010

References

External links
 
 

1974 births
Living people
Swedish footballers
Sweden international footballers
Sweden under-21 international footballers
Allsvenskan players
Superettan players
Division 2 (Swedish football) players
AIK Fotboll players
Degerfors IF players
Örebro SK players
Association football midfielders
Association football wingers
People from Karlskoga Municipality
Sportspeople from Örebro County